Glenn Jeffries is an American politician who is a member of the West Virginia Senate, representing the 8th district since January 11, 2017.

Jeffries was a Democrat until December 2022, when he became a Republican.

Election results

References

1961 births
Living people
People from Putnam County, West Virginia
People from South Charleston, West Virginia
Democratic Party West Virginia state senators
West Virginia State University alumni
Businesspeople from West Virginia
Baptists from West Virginia
21st-century American politicians